Heyvaert is a surname. Notable people with the surname include:

Pol Heyvaert, Belgian theatre director
Rob Heyvaert, Belgian businessman